Leone Patterson (born 11 December 1962) is a New Zealand former basketball player who competed in the 2000 Summer Olympics. Patterson also competed for New Zealand at the 1994 World Championship held in Australia.

References

1962 births
Living people
New Zealand women's basketball players
Olympic basketball players of New Zealand
Basketball players at the 2000 Summer Olympics